Marina Cergol (born 21 June 1965) is an Italian softball player who competed in the 2000 Summer Olympics.

References

1965 births
Living people
Italian softball players
Olympic softball players of Italy
Softball players at the 2000 Summer Olympics
Sportspeople from Trieste